Katja Nolten (born 26 February 1970) is a German table tennis player. She competed in the women's singles event at the 1988 Summer Olympics.

References

External links
 

1970 births
Living people
German female table tennis players
Olympic table tennis players of West Germany
Table tennis players at the 1988 Summer Olympics
People from Heinsberg
Sportspeople from Cologne (region)